The ginger-families or ginger group or Core Zingiberales is a terminal clade in the order Zingiberales (Monocotyledoneae) that comprises Zingiberaceae (the ginger family), Costaceae, Marantaceae and Cannaceae. Their shared synapomorphy of a single fertile anther and four or five highly modified staminodia differentiate them from the basal paraphyletic assemblage of the "banana-families".

They form a Suborder Zingiberineae Kress in taxonomic classification, with the following phylogeny, the four families being grouped into two superfamilies.

See also

Banana-families
Zingiberales
Monocotyledoneae

References

Bibliography

 

Zingiberales